The Dogma is a progressive metal/power metal band from Ancona, Italy.

Line-Up

Current members 
 Daniele Santori - Vocals
 Cosimo Binetti - Guitars
 Stefano Smeriglio - Keyboards and piano
 Marco Bianchella - Drums
 Jack Ast - Bass

Past members 
 Giuseppe Chirico - Drums
 Steve Vawamas - Bass
 Masso - Bass

Discography

Demos 

 Symphonies of Love and Hate (2002)

Studio albums 

 Black Roses (2006)
 A Good Day to Die (2007)
 Black Widow (2010)

References 

Musical groups established in 1999
Italian power metal musical groups
Italian progressive metal musical groups
Musical quintets
1999 establishments in Italy